Charles Robert Evans (8 September 1882 – 29 October 1947) was a Liberal party member of the House of Commons of Canada. He was born in Mount Forest, Ontario and became a farmer and lumber merchant.

He attended public and high schools in Mount Forest, and graduated from a two-year program at British American College.

Evans participated in municipal politics at Piapot, Saskatchewan as a school trustee and as a councillor.

He was first elected to Parliament at the Maple Creek riding in the 1935 general election and was re-elected for a second term in the 1940 election. After completing this term, Evans left federal politics and did not seek re-election in 1945.

References

External links
 

1882 births
1947 deaths
Canadian farmers
Liberal Party of Canada MPs
Members of the House of Commons of Canada from Saskatchewan
People from Wellington County, Ontario
Saskatchewan municipal councillors